"I Sat by the Ocean" is the second single by American rock band Queens of the Stone Age from their sixth studio album, ...Like Clockwork (2013). It was released on August 6, 2013, shortly after the band's performance at Lollapalooza music festival on August 4.

On July 31, 2013, Queens of the Stone Age performed the song on the late-night talk show Jimmy Kimmel Live!, together with the first single from the album, "My God Is the Sun".

Personnel
Credits from the official Queens of the Stone Age website.
 Josh Homme – lead vocals, guitar, slide guitar, shakers
 Troy Van Leeuwen – guitar, claps
 Dean Fertita – Wurly, piano, guitar, slide guitar
 Michael Shuman – vocals, bass, tambourine
 Joey Castillo – drums, claps

Chart performance

Certifications

References

External links
 Queens of the Stone Age ...Like Clockwork  – album lyrics and credits

2013 singles
Queens of the Stone Age songs
Songs written by Josh Homme
2013 songs
Matador Records singles